William F. Andrews was born January 29, 1946, in Allentown, Pennsylvania.

Andrews previously served as a Representative in the House of Representatives of the U.S. state of Florida.  He currently lives in Delray Beach, Florida, with his family.

Education
He received his bachelor's degree from the University of Florida.

External links
Official website

1946 births
Living people
Republican Party members of the Florida House of Representatives
People from Delray Beach, Florida
Politicians from Allentown, Pennsylvania
University of Florida alumni